This is a list of earthquakes in 1900. Only magnitude 6.0 or greater earthquakes appear on the list. Exceptions to this are earthquakes which have caused death, injury or damage. Events which occurred in remote areas will be excluded from the list as they wouldn't have generated significant media interest. All dates are listed according to UTC time. The countries and their flags are noted as they would have appeared in this year for example the Netherlands being in control of present-day Indonesia. An average year with 13 magnitude 7.0+ events being reported. The death toll was low with an event in Venezuela making up the vast majority of the total.

Overall

By death toll 

 Note: At least 10 casualties

By magnitude 

 Note: At least 7.0 magnitude

Notable events

January

April

May

June

July

August

September

October

November

December

References 

1900
1900 natural disasters
Lists of 19th-century earthquakes